Miroslav is a town in Znojmo District in the South Moravian Region of the Czech Republic. It has about 3,000 inhabitants.

Administrative parts
The village of Kašenec is an administrative part of Miroslav.

Geography
It lies on the border between the Bobrava Highlands and Dyje–Svratka Valley. Seven discontinuous areas on the hills south of the town form the Miroslavské kopce National Nature Monument.

History
The first written mention of Miroslav is from 1222. In 1533, during the rule of the noble family Valecký of Mírov (between 1497 and 1569), the village was promoted to a market town. In 1965, it became a town.

The town had a significant Jewish population. After the Jews were expelled from Brno and Znojmo in 1454, many of then came into Miroslav. The community disappeared during the Holocaust in the World War II.

Demographics

Economy
Miroslav is known for viticulture and apricot growing.

Sights

The Miroslav Castle is the most important monument. A Gothic water fortress in Miroslav was first mentioned in 1387. In the 16th century, it was rebuilt and extended into a Renaissance residence. From the 1670s to 1761, Baroque modifications were made, but the castle preserved its Gothic-Renaissance look. Today the castle is owned by the town and is open to the public.

Notable people
Isidor Neumann (1832–1906), Austrian dermatologist

Twin towns – sister cities

Miroslav is twinned with:
 Medzev, Slovakia

References

External links

Cities and towns in the Czech Republic
Populated places in Znojmo District